An endometrial stromal nodule is a noninfiltrative, circumscribed proliferation of endometrial stromal cells and is a benign subtype of endometrial stromal tumor. The appearance of the cells is identical to normal endometrial stromal cells. This can only be differentiated from low-grade endometrial stromal sarcoma by confirming lack of infiltration.

The differential includes cellular leiomyoma. Diagnosis may be aided by immunostaining; endometrial stromal nodules are positive for CD10; leiomyomas are positive for caldesmon and desmin (and sometimes CD10).

References

Uterine tumour